Captain Ian Voase Askew  (9 May 1921 – 14 April 2014) was a former officer in the British Army, winner of the Military Cross, High Sheriff of Sussex, huntsman with the Southdown Hunt and philanthropist.

References 

2014 deaths
King's Royal Rifle Corps officers
Recipients of the Military Cross
British Army personnel of World War II
English philanthropists
High Sheriffs of Sussex
British hunters
1921 births